Saint Gobrain ( 630s – November 16, 725) was a monk in Brittany. France and Bishop of Vannes. At the age of 87 he retired from his position to be a hermit. Gobrain died of natural causes in 725. His feast day is on November 16.

See also 

 Chronological list of saints in the 8th century

References

725 deaths
Medieval Breton saints
Bishops of Vannes
7th-century Breton people
630s births
8th-century Breton people